Ján Zlocha (24 March 1942 in Bratislava – 1 July 2013) was a Slovak football player. He played for Czechoslovakia, for which he played 4 matches.

He was a participant at the 1970 FIFA World Cup, where he played in a match against Romania.

He played mostly for Slovan Bratislava, Spartak Trnava and Dukla Prague. His brother Ľudovít was also a successful footballer.

References

External links
  ČMFS entry

1942 births
2013 deaths
Slovak footballers
Czechoslovak footballers
1970 FIFA World Cup players
Czechoslovakia international footballers
ŠK Slovan Bratislava players
FC Spartak Trnava players
Dukla Prague footballers
Association football defenders
Footballers from Bratislava